Iosif K is a ferry owned by Creta Cargo Lines.

History
Iosif K was launched in 1978 as Norwegian Challenger, originally owned by Steineger & Wik. She was chartered by Norient Line from 1980 to 1981 and then by OT Africa Line from 1981 to 1982. She was sold to Medorient Shipping Lines and renamed Jolly Bruno in 1982 and chartered to Ignazio Messina until 1993, when she was sold to Merchant Ferries. In 2002 she was sold to Cenargo International PLC and chartered to Norse Merchant Ferries. In 2004 she was sold to Brilliant Shipping Ltd, remaining on charter with Norse Merchant Ferries until 2005, when she was on short term charter to Cobelfret Ferries, resuming service with Norse Merchant Ferries later in the year until 2006, when she was chartered to Norfolk LineOn 14 December 2006, Iosif K was placed under arrest in Dublin after the International Transport Workers Federation (ITF) obtained a warrant at the High Court, claiming that the Russian and Latvian crew were owed tens of thousands of Euros in unpaid wages. An inspector from the ITF met with representatives of the owner in Dublin on 19 December 2006 to discuss the case. The company agreed to pay the back wages, and the High Court lifted its order preventing the ship from leaving port. The owners then refused crew members permission to go ashore unless the money paid was returned. Eight crew members left the ship. A further dispute about the payment of arrears owed to the crew broke out in February 2007. The ship was moored off Heysham, having sailed from Belfast. The crew were promised payment if they sailed back to Belfast, but eleven of the eighteen crew decided to leave. Norfolk Line had taken the ship off charter on arrival at Heysham as the ship was not being operated in accordance with the charter agreement. The Harbour Master ordered Iosif K to leave port to make way for incoming ships. The stand-off lasted for four days before the dispute was settled. Those crew wishing to leave were flown home and a new Russian crew flown in to operate her. A total of US$137,000 was paid to the crew in back pay. She was chartered by Scandlines in 2007 and then by Norfolk Line again in 2008. In January 2008 she was chartered by Seatruck Ferries for use on the Heysham - Warrenpoint route. Later that year she was chartered to P&O Irish Sea and the Isle of Man Steam Packet Company. On Decembder 2019 Iosif K arrived at Piraeus, Greece and laid up in Drapetsona. In February 2020 Iosif K bought from the Greek company Creta Cargo Lines and named it Iosif K.

References

External links
 Ship details

Ships of Seatruck Ferries
Ferries of the United Kingdom
Merchant ships of Jamaica
1979 ships
Ships built in Norway